The Longines Prize for Elegance is an award given by Longines to a male and female currently at the World Artistic Gymnastics Championships and the World Rhythmic Gymnastics Championships. The winners receive a trophy, a cheque, and a Longines watch. The prize has been awarded since 1997 and is aimed at honoring the most elegant and charismatic gymnasts. The criteria used by the jury is based on grace, harmonious movement, and emotion during the performances.

Recipients

World Artistic Gymnastics Championships

Women

Men

World Rhythmic Gymnastics Championships

Other events

  Svetlana Khorkina, 1998 European Women's Artistic Gymnastics Championships
  Viktoria Frater, 1999 European Rhythmic Gymnastics Championships
  Esther Dominguez, 2000 European Rhythmic Gymnastics Championships
  Cho Eun-jung, 2002 Asian Games
  Rebecca Downie, 2016 European Women's Artistic Gymnastics Championships
  David Belyavskiy, 2016 European Men's Artistic Gymnastics Championships

References 

Awards established in 1997
International awards
World Artistic Gymnastics Championships
Rhythmic Gymnastics World Championships